Albert Costa and Rafael Nadal were the defending champions, but did not participate this year.

Jonas Björkman and Max Mirnyi won in the final 2–6, 6–3, [10–8], against Christophe Rochus and Olivier Rochus.

Seeds

Draw

Draw

External links
Main Draw

2006 ATP Tour
2006 Qatar Open
Qatar Open (tennis)